Rina Einy Margulies (born 29 March 1965) is a British former professional tennis player.

Active on tour in the 1980s, Einy was born in Calcutta, India and is of Jewish descent. She had a best end of year ranking of 158 in 1983 and represented Great Britain at the 1984 Summer Olympics in Los Angeles, where tennis was a demonstration sport. A graduate of the London School of Economics and University of Cambridge, she is now working in the fashion industry, founding the company Culthread in 2018.

References

External links
 
 

1965 births
Living people
British female tennis players
Tennis players at the 1984 Summer Olympics
British people of Indian-Jewish descent
Tennis players from Kolkata
Alumni of the London School of Economics
Alumni of the University of Cambridge
Jewish tennis players
Olympic tennis players of Great Britain
20th-century British women